The WTA 1000 Mandatory and non-Mandatory tournaments, which are part of the WTA 1000 tournaments, make up the elite tour for professional women's tennis organised by the WTA called the WTA Tour. There are four 1000 Mandatory tournaments: Indian Wells, Miami, Madrid and Beijing and five non-Mandatory tournaments: Dubai, Rome, Canada, Cincinnati and Wuhan.

Tournaments

Results

Tournaments details

Dubai

Singles

Doubles

Miami

Singles

Doubles

Madrid

Singles

Doubles

Rome

Singles

Doubles

Montreal

Singles

Doubles

Cincinnati

Singles

Doubles

Indian Wells

Singles

Doubles

See also 
 WTA 1000 tournaments
 2021 WTA Tour
 2021 ATP Tour Masters 1000
 2021 ATP Tour

References

External links
 Women's Tennis Association (WTA) official website
 International Tennis Federation (ITF) official website

WTA 1000 tournaments